Phyllanthus hirtellus is a species of flowering plant in the family Phyllanthaceae. It is a miniature heath shrub, growing in erect or sprawling form. Stems are up to 30 cm long, leaves under 8 mm long. It is commonly found in heath or dry woodland in eastern Australia. The specific epithet hirtellus is derived from Latin, meaning finely hairy.

References

hirtellus
Flora of New South Wales
Flora of Queensland
Flora of Victoria (Australia)
Plants described in 1863
Taxa named by Ferdinand von Mueller
Taxa named by Johannes Müller Argoviensis